Jose "Coco" Navarro (born May 16, 1995) is an American soccer player who currently plays for Real Monarchs SLC in the USL.

Career

Youth and College
Navarro spent three years with the Real Salt Lake AZ Academy before signing a letter of intent to play college soccer at Marquette University.  In his freshman year with the Golden Eagles, Navarro made 21 appearances and tallied three goals including a game winner against Akron in the second round of the 2013 College Cup.  It was Marquette's first ever NCAA tournament victory.  He also recorded five assists that year and was named to the BIG EAST All-Rookie Team.  In 2014, he made 18 appearances and tallied two goals and an assist.

Professional
On January 29, 2015, it was announced that Navarro signed a professional contract with Real Monarchs SLC, a USL affiliate of Real Salt Lake.  On March 22, he made his professional debut in a 0–0 draw against LA Galaxy II.

References

External links
Marquette Golden Eagles bio

1995 births
Living people
American soccer players
Marquette Golden Eagles men's soccer players
Real Monarchs players
Association football midfielders
Soccer players from California
USL Championship players